The Many Sides of the Serendipity Singers is the second studio album by the Serendipity Singers. It peaked at number 68 on the Billboard Top LPs chart in 1964.

Track listing

Side one
"Let Me Fly Zion" – 1:40
"Beans in My Ears" – 2:06
"Soon It's Gonna Rain" – 2:42
"Mill Girls Don't Sing or Dance" – 2:22
"Look Away Over Yondro" – 1:58
"The New Frankie and Johnny Song" – 2:28

Side two
"You Don't Know" – 2:32
"Down Where the Wind Blows (Chilly Winds)" – 3:16
"Movin' in My Heart" – 2:06
"Six Foot Six" – 2:04
"Hi-Lili-Hi-Lo" – 2:52
"Fast Freight" - 2:22

Charts

References

1964 albums
Easy listening albums